The 2017 West Coast Conference women's basketball tournament was the postseason women's basketball tournament for the West Coast Conference for the 2017–18 season. All tournament games were played at the Orleans Arena in the Las Vegas-area community of Paradise, Nevada from March 2–6, 2018. Regular-season champion Gonzaga won the tournament and with it the WCC's automatic berth in the NCAA tournament.

Seeds
WCC tiebreaker procedures went as follows:
 Head-to-head
 Record against the top-seeded team(s) not involved in the tie, going down through the seedings as needed
 Higher RPI

* Overall record at end of regular season.

Schedule

Bracket and scores
 All BYUtv games were simulcast online and streamed at TheW.tv.

See also

 2017–18 NCAA Division I women's basketball season
 West Coast Conference men's basketball tournament
 2018 West Coast Conference men's basketball tournament
 West Coast Conference women's basketball tournament

References

Tournament
West Coast Conference women's basketball tournament
West Coast Conference women's basketball tournament
West Coast Conference women's basketball tournament
West Coast Conference Basketball Tournament, Women, 2017
Basketball competitions in the Las Vegas Valley
College basketball tournaments in Nevada
College sports tournaments in Nevada